Züüngovi (east govi) is a sum (district) of Uvs Province in western Mongolia.

It lies on the southern shore of Uvs Nuur. Part of the sum is covered with sand dunes.

References

Populated places in Mongolia
Districts of Uvs Province